Jose Carlos da Fonseca (born 19 September 1994), also known as Jose Fonseca, is a football player who currently plays for Timor-Leste national football team.

International career
Fonseca made his senior international debut in the friendly match against Indonesia national football team on 21 November 2010 when he was aged 16 years 63 days.

References

External links
 

1994 births
Living people
East Timorese footballers
Timor-Leste international footballers
East Timorese expatriate footballers
East Timorese expatriate sportspeople in Thailand
Expatriate footballers in Thailand
Association football midfielders
Footballers at the 2018 Asian Games
Asian Games competitors for East Timor